is a special file in Unix-like operating systems that provides as many null characters (ASCII NUL, 0x00) as are read from it. One of the typical uses is to provide a character stream for initializing data storage.

Function
Read operations from  return as many null characters (0x00) as requested in the read operation.

Unlike ,  may be used as a source, not only as a sink for data. All write operations to  succeed with no other effects. However,  is more commonly used for this purpose.

When  is memory-mapped, e.g., with mmap, to the virtual address space, it is equivalent to using anonymous memory; i.e. memory not connected to any file.

History
 was introduced in 1988 by SunOS-4.0 in order to allow a mappable BSS segment for shared libraries using anonymous memory. HP-UX 8.x introduced the MAP_ANONYMOUS flag for mmap(), which maps anonymous memory directly without a need to open .

Examples
The dd Unix utility program reads octet streams from a source to a destination, possibly performing data conversions in the process.
Destroying existing data on a file system partition (low-level formatting):

 dd =/dev/zero =/dev/<destination partition>

Creating a 1 MiB file, called foobar, filled with null characters:

 dd if=/dev/zero of=foobar count=1024 =1024

Note: The block size value can be given in SI (decimal) values, e.g. in GB, MB, etc. To create a  file one would simply type:

 dd if=/dev/zero of=foobar count=1 bs=1GB

Note: Instead of creating a real file with only zero bytes, many file systems also support the creation of sparse files which returns zeros upon reading but use less actual space.

See also
 Unix philosophy
 Standard streams

References

Unix file system technology
Device file